Misophonia (or selective sound sensitivity syndrome, sound-rage) is a neurobehavioral phenomenon associated with an intolerance of specific sounds or their associated stimuli, whose medical name and assessment vary over authors and methods. It can adversely affect the ability to achieve life goals and enjoy social situations. It was first recognized in 2001, though it is still not in the DSM-5 or any similar manual.

Reactions to sounds range from annoyance to anger, with possible activation of the fight-or-flight response. Common triggers include oral sounds (loud breathing, chewing, swallowing), clicking sounds (keyboard tapping, finger tapping, windshield wipers), and sounds associated with movement (fidgeting). Hated sounds are often repetitive and mundane in nature. It is believed by some researchers of the condition that these triggers originate from childhood or other notable, sometimes traumatic, events. Misophonia is not an auditory or psychiatric disorder. It also differs from phonophobia (fear of sound). There are no standard criteria for diagnosing misophonia. As of 2019, there were still no evidence-based methods to efficiently treat the condition.

Origin of term
The term was coined in 2001 by professor Pawel Jastreboff and doctor Margaret M. Jastreboff, with the assistance of the classicist Guy Lee,  introducing it in their article "Hyperacusis", with further explanation in the International Tinnitus and Hyperacusis Society's ITHS Newsletter.

The term was first used in a peer-reviewed journal in 2002.

"Misophonia" comes from the Ancient Greek words μῖσος, meaning "hate", and φωνή, meaning "voice" or "sound", loosely translating to "hate of sound", and was coined to differentiate the condition from other forms of decreased sound tolerance such as hyperacusis (hypersensitivity to certain frequencies and volume ranges) and phonophobia (fear of sounds).

Signs and symptoms
, the literature on misophonia was limited. Some small studies show that people with misophonia generally have strong negative feelings, thoughts, and physical reactions to specific sounds, which the literature calls "trigger sounds". These sounds usually appear quiet to others, but can seem loud to the person with misophonia, as if they can't hear anything except the sound. One study found that around 80% of the sounds were related to the mouth (e.g., eating, slurping, chewing or popping gum, whispering, whistling, nose sniffing) and around 60% were repetitive. A visual trigger may develop related to the trigger sound, and a misophonic reaction can occur in the absence of an actual sound (some examples can include leg swinging, twirling of hair, and pointing of fingers).

Reactions to triggers can range from mild (anxiety, discomfort, and/or disgust) to severe (rage, anger, hatred, panic, fear, and/or emotional distress). Reactions to the triggers can include aggression toward the origin of the sound, leaving, remaining in its presence but suffering, trying to block it or trying to mimic the sound. Reactions can also include physical responses such as increased heart rate, tightness in the chest and head, and hypertension. In extreme cases, sufferers may become physically violent toward the source of the sound.

The first misophonic reaction may occur when a person is young, often between the ages of 9 and 13, and can originate from someone in a close relationship, or a pet.

People with misophonia are aware they experience it and some consider it abnormal; the disruption it causes in their lives ranges from mild to severe. Fear and anxiety associated with trigger sounds can cause the person to avoid important social and other interactions that may expose them to these sounds. This avoidance and other behaviors can make it harder for people with this condition to achieve their goals and enjoy interpersonal interactions. It can also have a significant negative effect on their careers and relationships.

Mechanism
Misophonia's mechanism is not known, but it appears that it may be caused by a dysfunction of the central auditory system in the brain and not of the ears. The perceived origin and context of the sound appears to be essential to trigger a reaction.

A 2017 study found that the anterior insular cortex (which plays a role both in emotions like anger and in integrating outside input, such as sound, with input from organs such as the heart and lungs) causes more activity in other parts of the brain in response to triggers, particularly in the parts responsible for long-term memories, fear, and other emotions. It also found that people with misophonia have higher amounts of myelin (a fatty substance that wraps around nerve cells in the brain to provide electrical insulation). It is not clear whether myelin is a cause or an effect of misophonia and its triggering of other brain areas.

A 2021 study found that the orofacial motor cortex, a part of the brain representing lip, jaw, and mouth movement, has enhanced activation for typical trigger sounds much more than for aversive or neutral sounds in misophonia sufferers. It also found enhanced functional connectivity between orofacial motor cortex and secondary auditory cortex during sound perception for any sound. It further reported resting state fMRI functional connectivity between orofacial motor cortex and secondary auditory and visual brain areas as well as secondary interoceptive cortex (left anterior insula). This suggests that misophonia, which is typically thought of as a disorder of sound emotion processing, is a result of overactivation of the motor mirror neuron system involved in producing the movements associated with these trigger sounds or images.

Diagnosis
There are no standard diagnostic criteria, and many doctors are unaware of this condition. There has also been some debate among scholars whether misophonia meets the criteria of being labeled a new mental disorder or not. Misophonia is distinguished from hyperacusis, which is not specific to a given sound and does not involve a similar strong reaction, and from phonophobia, which is a fear of loud sounds, but it may occur with either.

It is not clear whether people with misophonia usually have comorbid conditions, nor whether there is a genetic component. Anecdotal research on the subject has supported the belief that misophonia may be genetic, but more research is needed to confirm the finding. It appears that misophonia can occur on its own or along with other health, developmental and psychiatric problems. When attempting to diagnose a patient with misophonia, doctors sometimes mistake its symptoms for an anxiety disorder, bipolar disorder or obsessive-compulsive disorder.

Classification
The diagnosis of misophonia is not recognized in the DSM-IV or the ICD-11, and it is not classified as a hearing or psychiatric disorder. It may be a form of sound–emotion synesthesia, and has parallels with some anxiety disorders. A 2022 survey of prominent researchers determined that misophonia should be classified as a disorder, and not a symptom, syndrome, or a condition. Arguments in favor of misophonia as a disorder believe it meets most of the criteria for this label, though the boundaries of the condition can appear somewhat unclear in some cases.

Management
As of 2018, there are no evidence-based treatments for the condition and no randomized clinical trial has been published; health care providers generally try to help people cope with misophonia by recognizing what the person is experiencing and working on coping strategies. A majority of smaller studies done on the subject have focused on the use of tinnitus retraining therapy, cognitive behavioral therapy and exposure therapy which is believed to decrease the person’s awareness of their trigger sounds. These treatment approaches have not been sufficiently studied to determine their effectiveness. Other possible treatment options have been theorized by researchers, including acceptance based approaches and mindfulness. Ultimately, it is speculated that treatment methods may vary significantly in effectiveness from patient to patient. 

Minimal research has been conducted on the possible effects of neuromodulation and pharmacologic treatments. A study published in 2022 suggests that some forms of misophonia treatment may vary in effectiveness based on the preference of each patient, particularly in cases of parents with children who have misophonia.

While large scale research has not yet been conducted, observation of coping strategies employed by people with misophonia has shown some consistent methods for coping with the condition. Some of these coping methods include usage of sound preventing ear plugs, headphones, mimicking trigger sounds, and music.

Epidemiology
Misophonia's prevalence is not known; nor is it known whether sex, gender, or age affect the likelihood of having misophonia. 

The existence of several online support groups with thousands of members has been cited as possibly indicative of its prevalence.

Associated symptoms
Some people have sought to relate misophonia to autonomous sensory meridian response, or auto-sensory meridian response (ASMR), a pleasant form of paresthesia, a tingling sensation that typically begins on the scalp and moves down the back of the neck and upper spine. ASMR is described as the opposite of what can be observed in reactions to specific audio stimuli in misophonia. There are plentiful anecdotal reports of people who claim to have both misophonia and ASMR. Common to these reports is the experience of ASMR in response to some sounds and misophonia in response to others.

Society and culture
People who experience misophonia have formed online support groups.

Portrayal in media has sometimes depicted the condition as existing predominantly in younger people, but research has shown that it can arise in  elderly individuals as well.

In 2016, a documentary about the condition, Quiet Please, was released.

In 2020, a team of misophonia researchers received the Ig Nobel Prize in medicine "for diagnosing a long-unrecognized medical condition".

Notable cases
 Richard E. Grant
 Barron H. Lerner
 Melanie Lynskey
 Kelly Ripa
 Sarah Silverman

See also 
 Stimulus control

References

Further reading

External links 
 The Duke Center for Misophonia and Emotion Regulation, part of Duke University Health System
 Misophonia Research Fund, initiative of a private family foundation
 Quiet Please, official website of 2016 documentary about misophonia, with trailer

Central nervous system disorders
Diseases of the ear and mastoid process
Mental disorders
Synesthesia